Air Italy may refer to:

Air Italy (2005–2018)
Air Italy (2018–2020)